is a passenger railway station located in the city of  Akō, Hyōgo Prefecture, Japan, operated by the West Japan Railway Company (JR West).

Lines

Station layout
The station consists of one ground-level side platform serving a single-directional track, with the station building on the right side when facing in the direction of Okayama. The station is unattended. When the station was opened, it had an island platform, but only one side of the platform was used for passenger operations, with the other side used exclusively for freight. The railroad tracks are slightly S-shaped at both ends of the station. This is a remnant of a plan to draw another railroad track on the south side of the existing track so that express trains could pass; however, as the Akō Line was later determined to be used only for local operations, this plan was never completed.

Adjacent stations

|-
!colspan=5|JR West

History
Bizen-Fukukawa Station was opened on March 1, 1955. At the time, the local municipality was Fukukawa village in Wake district of Okayama Prefecture, hence the use of "Bizen" in the station name (as Bizen province was part of what is now Okayama]]. However, on September 1, 1963, the village was transferred to Hyōgo prefecture. With the privatization of the Japan National Railways (JNR) on April 1, 1987, the station came under the aegis of the West Japan Railway Company.

Passenger statistics
In fiscal 2019, the station was used by an average of 30 passengers daily

Surrounding area
Hyogo West Agricultural Cooperative (JA Hyogo West) Shioya Branch 
Japan National Route 250

See also
List of railway stations in Japan

References

External links

 JR West Station Official Site

Railway stations in Hyōgo Prefecture
Railway stations in Japan opened in 1955
Akō, Hyōgo